Foreshore Road is one of the prestigious roads in the city of Srinagar.  The notability of the road lies in the fact that the entire road lies on the banks of Dal Lake. The road starts from Hazratbal, Srinagar and ends at Nishat. The famous Mughal Gardens of Shalimar Bagh and Nishat Bagh are situated on the road. The economy of the people living here greatly depends on tourism. The road is also connected to the Boulevard road. Driving on the road provides glances of the beautiful Dal Lake and views of the sunset can be enjoyed from this road. In the summers the cool breeze of Dal Lake provides respite to the people resting on the roadside. From 13 April every year, government officials open the Mughal Gardens for visitors around the world. Due to this, tourists can be seen on the way to visit these places. The Foreshore and Boulevard roads also host largest number of hotels for tourists in Srinagar and is maintained by the Government of Jammu and Kashmir regularly.

Gallery

See also
 Hazratbal Shrine
 Kashmir University
 National Institute of Technology, Srinagar
 90 Feet Road
 Lal Bazar

References

Transport in Srinagar
Roads in Jammu and Kashmir